The Sportatorium, located in downtown Dallas, Texas, was a barn-like arena used primarily for professional wrestling events. The building, which stood at 1000 S. Industrial Blvd, or the intersection of Industrial Boulevard and Cadiz Street (near the I-30/I-35E Interchange), had a seating capacity of approximately 4,500.

Early history

Built in 1934 by the Cox Fence Company, the original Dallas Sportatorium was constructed in the shape of an octagon, and seated approximately 10,000.  Its inaugural wrestling event, promoted by Burt Willoughby, took place on December 9, 1935.  Willoughby promoted wrestling at the Sportatorium until 1940, when the company was bought out by its former concessions manager, Ed McLemore.

From 1948 until 1966, the Sportatorium was also the site of the Big D Jamboree, a weekly country music showcase similar in format to the Grand Ole Opry and Louisiana Hayride; portions of the Jamboree were broadcast nationally on the CBS Radio Network.

The Sportatorium was partially destroyed by fire on May 1, 1953, in what was rumored to be an act of arson by a rival wrestling promoter. It was quickly rebuilt at the same location as a rectangular venue (with a modified octagonal seating configuration similar to the original), and reopened on September 22 of that year, billed at the time as The Million-Dollar Sportatorium. The arena also held boxing events and concerts featuring up-and-coming rock stars over the years, very much in the same manner as its Los Angeles counterpart, the Grand Olympic Auditorium, did during this time frame.

In late 1966, McLemore formed a partnership with wrestler Jack Adkisson, who was known in the ring as Fritz Von Erich and bought the Dallas/Fort Worth Wrestling Office, breaking away from Paul Boesch and the Houston Wrestling Office. In January 1968, McLemore started suffering a series of heart attacks and was no longer able to attend to the company's day-to-day business; he died on January 9, 1969, leaving Adkisson in charge. Adkisson's promotion, which became known in the early 1980s as World Class Championship Wrestling and featured his sons as its top stars, was the most famous and successful wrestling federation to run regularly at the Dallas Sportatorium.

The arena was configured with several ring aisles with the majority of the seats (mostly bleachers) set up on the east, south and west portions of the building.  The north side of the building, best known as "Section D", was used mostly for a small stage and media area for cameras and reporters, but at least 10 rows of seats were also set up between the main stage/ring and the wall.  A United States flag was displayed on the wall of section D for most of the arena's existence, and was changed once when the 48-star U.S. flag was replaced with a 50-star U.S. flag in 1960.  The flag was moved to the section C area in 1987, then later above section I in the 1990s when the arena was refurbished for the Global Wrestling Federation.

During wrestling matches, the heel wrestlers came out of the northwest aisle, between sections B & C, while the babyfaces came out of the aisle on the southwest corner, or sections J & A.  A broadcast studio was set up adjacent to the heel's locker room area; and an overhead section was later added for wrestling announcers to call the match.

On the Industrial Blvd side of the arena was the offices of Big Time Wrestling/World Class Championship Wrestling (WCCW).  Jack Adkisson and his sons each shared office space in the arena.  Others like David Manning, Gary Hart, Ken Mantell, Percy Pringle, Skandor Akbar and Chris Adams would also occupy the front offices of the arena.

Eric Embry, who was the Sportatorium's lead booker, lived inside the arena for a time in 1989.

Decline
After WCCW folded in 1990 due to dwindling attendance, fundamental changes in the wrestling industry and tragedies involving a number of its top stars (including all but one of the Von Erichs, Gino Hernandez, and Bruiser Brody), the Sportatorium served as home base for the Global Wrestling Federation from 1991 to 1994 (billing itself for a time as the GlobalDome). Following the GWF's demise, a succession of smaller promotions (including the NWA between 1995 and 1996) attempted to hold shows in the building, each of them running out of money and closing their doors after only a short time.

However, it did gain one last bit of notoriety in March 1992 when Dallas-based Southwest Airlines held an arm-wrestling match between chairman Herb Kelleher and Kurt Herwald, chairman of Stevens Aviation, resulting from controversy over Southwest's use of the slogan "Just Plane Smart" (Stevens claimed that it infringed on its own "Plane Smart" slogan).  The match was a publicity stunt designed to raise funds for charity.

The Sportatorium fell into disuse in the late 1990s when local independent wrestling promotions, by now drawing crowds only in the low hundreds, elected to run their shows in dance halls and other smaller venues instead. In addition, the aging arena was seriously dilapidated by this time, was out of compliance with local building codes, and was often used as a shelter by homeless people who entered the building illegally.

In late December 2001 a fire started inside the building. The flames quickly spread and caused major damage to the arena's upstairs offices. The fire proved to be the coup de grâce for the Sportatorium, its long-rumored demolition finally taking place in the spring of 2003. Before its implosion, Kevin Von Erich took off a bench-seat and a few items from the Sportatorium as souvenirs. Kevin took one final tour of the historic arena, which was featured in its famed DVD documentary Heroes of World Class, released in 2006. Exactly 10 years after the death of Kerry Von Erich, February 18, 2003, the "World Famous Sportatorium" Main Entrance sign was saved from demolition by wrestling announcer Doyle King, who retains possession of it to this day. It has been on display at several local wrestling reunions and some local Dallas Fort Worth wrestling events.

Although it had a reputation for being uncomfortable and unsanitary (having inadequate heating and cooling facilities, rodent infestation problems and apparently a large chamber or pit in the foundation), the Dallas Sportatorium is nonetheless still remembered fondly for its intimate atmosphere, and is considered one of pro wrestling's most legendary venues.

The land that had been occupied by the arena is slated to be a part of the new Trinity River Project, which has led to the renaming of Industrial Boulevard to Riverfront Boulevard.

External links
Percy Pringle's Sportatorium tribute
Rockabilly Hall of Fame's Sportatorium/Big D Jamboree page (includes article on demolition)
World Class Memories: WCCW FREQUENTLY ASKED QUESTIONS - THE SPORTATORIUM

1935 establishments in Texas
2003 disestablishments in Texas
Buildings and structures in the United States destroyed by arson
Defunct indoor arenas in Texas
Demolished sports venues in Texas
Global Wrestling Federation
Rebuilt buildings and structures in the United States
World Class Championship Wrestling
Wrestling venues in the Dallas–Fort Worth metroplex
Sports venues completed in 1935
Sports venues in Dallas
Defunct sports venues in Texas
Music venues in Dallas
Arson in Texas
Sports venues demolished in 2003